This is the full filmography of Zeenat Aman, an Indian actress who is known for her work in Bollywood films.

Aman began acting in 1970, and her early works included the films The Evil Within (1970) and Hulchul (1971). Her breakthrough came with the film Hare Rama Hare Krishna (1971), in which her performance was praised, and she won the Filmfare Best Supporting Actress Award for her performance. She next starred in the film Yaadon Ki Baaraat (1973), for which she received further recognition, and established herself as a leading actress in the seventies with starring roles in Roti Kapada Aur Makaan (1974), Ajanabee (1974), Warrant (1975), Chori Mera Kaam (1975), Dharam Veer (1977), Chhailla Babu (1977), Hum Kisise Kum Naheen (1977), and The Great Gambler (1979), all of which were successful. In 1978, Aman starred in the film Satyam Shivam Sundaram, which has received critical acclaim, and for the role, she was nominated for the Filmfare Award for Best Actress. She also starred in Don (1978), a film which spawned the Don film series.

In the 1980s, Aman had leading roles in five successful films in a row, Abdullah (1980), Alibaba Aur 40 Chor (1980), Qurbani (1980), Dostana (1980), and Insaf Ka Tarazu (1980), the latter of which Aman received praise for her performance, earning her another nomination for the Filmfare Award for Best Actress. She continued starring in films throughout the 1980s, starring in the successes Laawaris (1981), Mahaan (1983), Pukar (1983), Jagir (1984), and also had roles in the films Teesri Aankh (1982), Hum Se Hai Zamana (1983). Following her marriage to actor Mazhar Khan in 1985, Aman began appearing less frequently in films to focus on her marriage, and took a hiatus in 1989, appearing in her last film for that period, Gawaahi.

In 1999, Aman made a comeback to acting, appearing in the film Bhopal Express. She didn't continue acting until 2003, appearing in the film Boom, and has since starred in Ugly Aur Pagli (2008), Dunno Y... Na Jaane Kyon (2010), Chaurahen (2012), Strings of Passion (2014), Dunno Y2... Life Is a Moment (2015), Dil Toh Deewana Hai (2016), Sallu Ki Shaadi (2017), and Panipat (2019).

Filmography

References

External links 

• 

Indian filmographies
Actress filmographies